The rowing events of the 1951 Mediterranean Games were held in Alexandria, Egypt.

Medalists

Medal table

References
1951 Mediterranean Games report at the International Committee of Mediterranean Games (CIJM) website
List of Olympians who won medals at the Mediterranean Games at Olympedia.org

Mediterranean Games
Sports at the 1951 Mediterranean Games
1951